Cosmosoma seraphina is a moth of the subfamily Arctiinae. It was described by Gottlieb August Wilhelm Herrich-Schäffer in 1854. It is found in the Amazon region.

References

seraphina
Moths described in 1854